Chao Manthaturath (also spelled Manthathourat or Mangthaturat; ; 1772–7 March 1837) was the king of Luang Phrabang from 1819 to 1836. 

He was a son of king Anouruttha. In 1791, he was appointed as heir presumptive to the Luang Phrabang throne with the title Raxavong by Siamese. He was crowned by Siamese at the age of 43. From 1825 to 1826 he joint the monkhold in Bangkok, leaving his country to be administered by Siamese officials. In 1826, he refused to join Anouvong's Rebellion against Siamese. He died on 7 March 1837. Siamese did not confirm his son to succeed the throne until 1839.

References

Kings of Luang Phrabang
1772 births
1837 deaths
18th-century Laotian people
19th-century Laotian people